Henry Collin Minton (1855–1924) was the chairman of Systematic Theology in the San Francisco Theological Seminary from December 2, 1891 to October 1, 1902. He then became the minister for the First Presbyterian Church in Trenton, New Jersey.

Biography
He was born in Prosperity, Pennsylvania, and attended Washington and Jefferson College, where he received his received B.A. in 1879, his M.A. in 1882, his D.D. in 1892, and his LL.D. in 1902. He graduated from the Western Theological Seminary in 1882 and was licensed in 1881 by the Presbytery of Washington, Pennsylvania. He was ordained in June 1882 by the Presbytery of St. Paul, Minnesota. He was Pastor of the First Church of Duluth, Minnesota from 1882 to 1883, and Pastor-elect of Second Church, Baltimore, Maryland, in 1882. He moved to California in 1884 and was Pastor of the First Presbyterian Church, San Jose, 1885–1891; Pastor-elect of Saint John's Church, San Francisco, 1891–1893; and Pastor of the First Presbyterian Church in Trenton, New Jersey in 1902.

References

History of Trenton, New Jersey
Washington & Jefferson College alumni
1855 births
1924 deaths
American theologians